was a Japanese girl idol group. It was formed in 2013 of 21 finalists (with the average age of 14 years) of the 13th Japan Bishōjo Contest and is affiliated to the entertainment company Oscar Promotion.

Members

Former members

Discography

Studio albums

Singles

Music videos

Notes

References

External links 
 
 X21 official fanclub
 Go! Oscar! X21 — X21's own program on TV Asahi
 Ameba official relay 
 Official blog on Suta Buro (Oricon Star Blog)
 Official blog on Mixi
 Official blog on Gree
 Official blog on Livedoor

Musical groups established in 2013
2013 establishments in Japan
Japanese idol groups
Avex Group artists
Japanese girl groups
Musical groups disestablished in 2018